The Jacket is a 2005 American science-fiction psychological thriller film directed by John Maybury and starring Adrien Brody, Keira Knightley, Kris Kristofferson and Jennifer Jason Leigh. It is partly based on the 1915 Jack London novel The Star Rover, published in the United Kingdom as The Jacket. Massy Tadjedin wrote the screenplay based on a story by Tom Bleecker and Marc Rocco. The original music score is composed by Brian Eno and the cinematography is by Peter Deming.

The narrative is a time slip fantasy in which a Gulf War veteran who suffered a death or near-death experience while on active service returns to the United States where he is blamed for the death of a policeman, and incarcerated in a hospital for the criminally insane. Subject to experimental treatments there, which involve him being shut inside a morgue casket while tied in a straitjacket, he eventually learns to travel through time and is able to offer help to various people.

The Jacket premiered at the Sundance Film Festival on January 23, 2005, and was released in theaters in the United States by Warner Independent Pictures on March 4, 2005. It grossed $21.1 million on a budget of $28.5 million and received mixed reviews from critics.

Plot
After miraculously recovering from an apparently fatal bullet wound to the head, Gulf War veteran Jack Starks returns to Vermont in 1992, suffering from periods of amnesia. While walking, he sees a young girl, Jackie, and her alcoholic mother in despair beside their broken-down truck. Starks and Jackie quickly form a certain affinity; she asks him to give her his dogtags and he does so. He gets the truck started for them and continues on his way. Shortly after, a man driving along the same highway gives Jack a ride and they get pulled over by a policeman.

The scene changes: Starks is found lying on the deserted roadside near the dead policeman, with a slug from the policeman's gun in his body. The murder weapon is on the ground nearby. Although he testifies there was someone else at the scene, he is not believed because of his amnesia. Starks is found not guilty by reason of insanity and is incarcerated in a mental institution.

Starks is placed in the care of Dr. Thomas Becker, a psychiatrist, and his staff. In December 1992, Starks is forced to undergo an unauthorized treatment designed by Becker: he is injected with experimental drugs, bound in a straitjacket and then placed inside a morgue drawer as a form of sensory deprivation. While in this condition, he is somehow able to travel 15 years into the future and stay there for a short time. He meets an older version of Jackie at a roadside diner where she works. He suspects this happens because it is the only memory he can ever fully hold on to. She does not recognise him but seeing him standing forlornly, she takes pity on him and offers him shelter, just for the night. While in her apartment, Starks comes across his own dogtags and confronts her. Jackie, frightened, tells him that Jack Starks died on New Year's Day in 1993, and so he cannot possibly be who he says he is. She becomes upset and asks him to leave. Subsequently, Starks is transported back to the future on several occasions in the course of his treatment and, after earning Jackie's trust, they try to figure out how to make use of the time-travelling so as to remove Jack from the hospital and save his life.

Early on 1 January 1993, knowing that his time is quickly running out, Starks is briefly taken out of the hospital by Dr. Beth Lorenson, who he has finally convinced of his time travel experiences and his knowledge of future events. She drives Starks to the childhood home of Jackie and her mother, where he gives the mother a letter he has written, which outlines Jackie's bleak future and warns the mother that she is fated to orphan Jackie when she falls asleep with a lit cigarette in her hand and is burned to death. When he returns to the hospital, Starks experiences a flashback to the head wound he suffered in Iraq, simultaneously slipping on the ice and hits his head. Bleeding profusely, he convinces two of the more sympathetic doctors to put him into the jacket one last time.

Starks returns to 2007, where he finds that his letter to Jackie's mother has made all the difference. Jackie now has a better life than in the previous version of 2007.  She is no longer a waitress, is now dressed in a nurse's uniform, and has a noticeably more cheerful outlook. They reprise their first 2007 meeting: she sees Starks standing in the snow and initially drives past him, but backs up when she notices his head wound. She stops and offers to take him to the hospital where she works. While they are in the car, Jackie receives a call from her mother — still alive and well. They drive on, the screen fades to white and we hear Jackie's voice ask, "How much time do we have?", a question she has asked him before. As the credits start to roll, the answer to the question, in this new future, is given by the words of the song "We Have All the Time in the World" sung by Iggy Pop.

Cast

Background
The Jacket shares its title, and the idea of a person experiencing extra-corporeal time-travel while in an intolerably tight straitjacket, with a 1915 novel by Jack London. The novel was published in the United Kingdom as The Jacket and in the United States of America as The Star Rover. Director Maybury has said that the film is "loosely based on a true story that became a Jack London story". The true story is that of Ed Morrell, who told London about San Quentin prison's inhumane use of tight straitjackets.

Reception

Box office
The Jacket opened on March 4, 2005, and grossed $2,723,682 on opening weekend, with a peak release of 1,331 theaters in the United States. The film went on to gross $6,303,762 domestically, for a total of $21,126,225 worldwide.

Critical response
 On Metacritic, it had a score of 44% based on reviews from 35 critics, indicating "mixed or average reviews".

Roger Ebert of the Chicago Sun-Times gave it two out of four stars and wrote: "You can sense an impulse toward a better film, and Adrien Brody and Keira Knightley certainly take it seriously, but the time-travel whiplash effect sets in, and it becomes, as so many time travel movies do, an exercise in early entrances, late exits, futile regrets."

See also
 La Jetée, a 1962 French science fiction featurette in which sensory deprivation and strong memories lead to time travel.

References

External links
 
 
 

2005 films
2005 psychological thriller films
American psychological thriller films
American supernatural thriller films
Films about time travel
American nonlinear narrative films
Films based on American novels
Films based on works by Jack London
Films set in psychiatric hospitals
Films set in 1992
Films set in 1993
Films set in 2007
Films shot in Montreal
Films shot in Scotland
Films shot in England
Films directed by John Maybury
Warner Independent Pictures films
English-language Scottish films
Mandalay Pictures films
Films shot in Edinburgh
Films produced by George Clooney
Fiction about amnesia
Films produced by Steven Soderbergh
Films produced by Peter Guber
American supernatural horror films
2000s supernatural horror films
2005 independent films
2000s English-language films
2000s American films